The Bury is a building of historical significance in Hemel Hempstead in the county of Hertfordshire, England. It was erected in about 1790 by an attorney who worked in the town. It was the residence for the next two centuries of many notable people. It is now owned by the Dacorum Borough Council and is Grade II* listed.

Ginger family

William Ginger (1742–1793), an attorney, erected the current building in about 1790. He demolished a manor house on the site, which had previously been owned by his father William Ginger (1699–1783), who was also an attorney. He appears to have been unmarried because, when he died in 1793 at the age of only 51, the house was inherited by his younger brother Richard Ginger. In 1796 the magazine called the Monthly Mirror published an article about the property, which contained an etching of the house. They described the estate which they called "Mr Ginger’s Villa" in the following terms:

Shortly after this, Richard Ginger, who had formerly lived in Queenhithe in London, was declared bankrupt and was forced to sell all of his property. A sale notice for all of his inherited Hemel Hempstead holdings was published in the newspapers in 1797 and is shown. The description of The Bury is as follows:

William Hilton, a merchant who traded in England and Ireland, bought the property and lived there for about ten years.

Grover family
Harry Grover (1761–1835) was a resident in The Bury from about 1808 until his death in 1835. He was born in 1761 in Hammersmith. His father was Montague Grover (1723–1795) and his mother was Letitia Moody. He became a solicitor, and married Sibylla Ehret, who was the granddaughter of the famous botanical artist Georg Dionysius Ehret. The couple lived in Watford for some years, and then in about 1792 they moved to Hemel Hempstead, where they rented several houses before they tenanted The Bury in about 1808 and later bought it. As well as being a solicitor, he became a banker and established the firm Grover and Pollard.

The couple had ten children. One of them, Henry Montague Grover, became a notable writer. Henry died in 1835, and his wife Sibylla continued to live at The Bury until her death in 1853. The house was advertised for sale in 1854 and was bought by Anthony Thatcher.

Residents after 1850

Anthony Thatcher (1805–1869) was born in 1805 in Marylebone, Middlesex. He was a glass-bottle manufacturer. He died in 1869, and the house was rented for a few years by Charles Ridgway (1793–1876), a draper and landowner, and his wife Maria. James Brister was a tenant until 1876, when he departed for the Cape of Good Hope.

Henry Wyman (1844–1894) was the next resident. He was a master brewer, and in 1879 he married Marion Steer (1853–1949). The couple lived there until about 1886, and then Rear Admiral Hugh Maximilian Elliot rented the property for two years. From 1888 until about 1892 Robert James Pratt, a school teacher, and his wife Harriet lived in the house. Mrs Anderson was the tenant in 1895; Lieutenant Colonel William Henry Dawes Jones, his wife Emily and children, in 1899.

In 1908 John Hughes Drake moved into The Bury with his new wife, Muriel Rosdew Raffles-Flint, who was the daughter of Stamford Raffles-Flint, the Archdeacon of Cornwall. Their wedding was reported in detail in the Royal Cornwall Gazette, with accompanying photographs. In 1914 John joined the armed forces as a major and fought in World War I, serving in Egypt and France. He was mentioned in dispatches three times and was awarded the Military Cross in 1917. He was made an Officer of the Order of the British Empire (O.B.E.) on his return from the war in 1919. He joined the family company, called Messrs J. V. Drake and Co., who were sugar merchants.

In 1926 Frederick Oldham Chinner was living at The Bury. By 1928 Judge Edward Watkins Cave was the resident, and he remained there for the next ten years. Geoffrey Thomas Unwin (1874–1948), who was a well-known sportsman, retired at The Bury in about 1944. In 1954 the building was bought by Hemel Hempstead Rural District Council and was converted for use as their offices. From 1969 the building was also used as a registry office as well as council offices. The building passed from Hemel Hempstead Rural District Council to Dacorum Borough Council when local government was reorganised in 1974.

Museum and art gallery proposals
In 2016, Dacorum Council vacated the building and relocated its registry office to Hemel town centre. Dacorum Heritage Trust, a local history advocacy group, has proposed that the building should be converted into a museum and art gallery, to display a collection of archaeological and historical artefacts from the surrounding area. The project is currently awaiting necessary funding and planning permission to proceed.

See also
:Category:Local museums in Hertfordshire
:Category:Art museums and galleries in Hertfordshire

Notes

References

External links

Dacorum Heritage Trust

Buildings and structures in Hemel Hempstead
Grade II* listed buildings in Hertfordshire
Proposed museums in the United Kingdom
Georgian architecture in England
Houses completed in 1790